The Samuel Miller House is a historic home located at Lynchburg, Virginia, United States.  It is associated with Samuel Miller (1792-1869), a successful businessman and investor who was among the wealthiest men in the South during the years preceding the American Civil War.  It is a large frame house erected between 1826 and 1829, and expanded and modified numerous times through the 20th century.  Outbuildings consist of a cottage, stable, woodshed, and garage.  The surrounding property was contested terrain during the siege of Lynchburg (June 1864), when a cavalry skirmish occurred on the property.

It was listed on the National Register of Historic Places in 1992.

References

Houses on the National Register of Historic Places in Virginia
Houses completed in 1829
Federal architecture in Virginia
Houses in Lynchburg, Virginia
National Register of Historic Places in Lynchburg, Virginia